Graeme E Thomas (born 8 November 1988) is a British rower.

Rowing career
Thomas competed at the 2013 World Rowing Championships in Chungju, where he won a bronze medal as part of the quad sculls with Sam Townsend, Charles Cousins and Peter Lambert. The following year he competed at the 2014 World Rowing Championships in Bosbaan, Amsterdam, where he won a silver medal as part of the quadruple sculls with Townsend, Cousins and Lambert.

He was selected for the quadruple sculls for the 2016 Olympics, but illness forced him to withdraw shortly before racing started. He won a silver medal at the 2017 World Rowing Championships in Sarasota, Florida, as part of the quadruple sculls with Jack Beaumont, Jonathan Walton and John Collins.

In 2021, he won a European bronze medal in the double sculls in Varese, Italy. Then he won the Diamond Challenge Sculls at Henley Royal Regatta.

References

External links

1988 births
Living people
English male rowers
Sportspeople from Preston, Lancashire
World Rowing Championships medalists for Great Britain
European Rowing Championships medalists
Olympic rowers of Great Britain
Rowers at the 2020 Summer Olympics